The 1986 NFL draft was the procedure by which National Football League teams selected amateur college football players. It is officially known as the NFL Annual Player Selection Meeting. The draft was held April 29–30, 1986, at the Marriott Marquis in New York City, New York. The league also held a supplemental draft after the regular draft and before the regular season.

The first overall selection of the draft, Bo Jackson, had told the Tampa Bay Buccaneers prior to the draft that he would refuse to sign with the team.  Disputes with team owner Hugh Culverhouse intensified after Jackson was ruled ineligible to play college baseball due to a trip he took with Culverhouse. This angered Jackson, as Culverhouse had assured him that the visit would not cause any NCAA violations. It was said that Jackson, who was having what he called his best year playing baseball in school, made the Buccaneers nervous and that by getting him somehow ruled ineligible to play baseball, he would be forced to focus on football. Prior to the 1987 NFL Draft, the Buccaneers forfeited their rights to Jackson.

Player selections

Round one

Round two

Round three

Round four

Round five

Round six

Round seven

Round eight

Round nine

Round ten

Round eleven

Round twelve

Hall of Famers
Charles Haley, linebacker from James Madison, taken 4th round 96th overall by San Francisco 49ers 
Inducted: Professional Football Hall of Fame class of 2015.

Notable undrafted players

References

External links
 NFL.com – 1986 Draft
 databaseFootball.com – 1986 Draft
 Pro Football Hall of Fame

National Football League Draft
NFL Draft
Draft
NFL Draft
NFL Draft
American football in New York City
1980s in Manhattan
Sporting events in New York City
Sports in Manhattan